Entomological Review is a peer-reviewed scientific journal covering all aspects of entomology. The journal was established in 1921 and is published by Pleiades Publishing in collaboration with Springer Science+Business Media. The editor-in-chief is Boris Alexandrovich Korotyaev. The journal publishes research articles, brief communications, comments, editorials, and reviews.

Abstracting and indexing
The journal is abstracted and indexed in AGRICOLA, Aquatic Sciences and Fisheries Abstracts, CAB Abstracts, and Scopus.

References

External links

English-language journals
Springer Science+Business Media academic journals
Publications established in 1921
Entomology journals and magazines
9 times per year journals